The Karnataka Legislative Assembly is the lower house of the bicameral legislature of Karnataka state in India. Karnataka is one of the six states in India, where the state legislature is bicameral, comprising two houses. The two houses are the Vidhan Sabha (lower house) and the Vidhan Parishad (upper house).

In summer, the seat of the Legislative Assembly is in Bangalore, the capital of the state, while in winter it is at Belagavi, in the northern part of the state. The term of the Legislative Assembly is five years, unless dissolved earlier. Presently, it comprises 224 members who are directly elected from single-seat constituencies.


List of current constituencies 

Following are the current constituencies of the Legislative Assembly of Karnataka. Out of these, 36 are reserved for Scheduled Castes and 15 for Scheduled Tribes. The ST seats are mainly in the central and northeast, around Bellari, Haveri and Raichur, since that is where most of the ST population is concentrated.

List of former constituencies

References 

 
Karnataka
Constituencies